Vincent Gérard (born 16 December 1986) is a French handball player for Saint-Raphaël Var  and the French national team.

In the 2020 Olympics he was selected into the All-Star Team.

Club career
Gérard began playing handball in SMEC Metz from the French D2. After three seasons in Metz first-team, while Gérard been some of the most important players in the club, he decided not to renew his contract with Metz and joined Montpellier Handball, from the LNH Division 1. Gérard was not a key part of Montpellier, and selected as 2nd and 3rd goalkeeper. However, he was part of Montpellier's league title win in 2007–08 season.

Individual awards
 French Championship Best Goalkeeper: 2011, 2013, 2014, 2017, 2018

References

External links

1986 births
Living people
French male handball players
Olympic handball players of France
Handball players at the 2016 Summer Olympics
Medalists at the 2016 Summer Olympics
Olympic silver medalists for France
Olympic medalists in handball
Montpellier Handball players
Handball players at the 2020 Summer Olympics
Medalists at the 2020 Summer Olympics
Olympic gold medalists for France